A solar cell panel, solar electric panel, or solar panel, also known as a photo-voltaic (PV) module or PV panel, is an assembly of photovoltaic solar cells mounted in a (usually rectangular) frame. Solar panels capture sunlight as a source of radiant energy, which is converted into electric energy in the form of direct current (DC) electricity.

A neatly organised collection of solar panels is called a photovoltaic system or solar array. Arrays of a photovoltaic system can be used to generate solar electricity that supplies electrical equipment directly, or feeds power back into an alternate current (AC) grid via an inverter system.

History 

In 1839, the ability of some materials to create an electrical charge from light exposure was first observed by the French physicist Edmond Becquerel. Though these initial solar panels were too inefficient for even simple electric devices, they were used as an instrument to measure light.

The observation by Becquerel was not replicated again until 1873, when the English electrical engineer Willoughby Smith discovered that the charge could be caused by light hitting selenium. After this discovery, William Grylls Adams and Richard Evans Day published "The action of light on selenium" in 1876, describing the experiment they used to replicate Smith's results.

In 1881, the American inventor Charles Fritts created the first commercial solar panel, which was reported by Fritts as "continuous, constant and of considerable force not only by exposure to sunlight but also to dim, diffused daylight." However, these solar panels were very inefficient, especially compared to coal-fired power plants.

In 1939, Russell Ohl created the solar cell design that is used in many modern solar panels. He patented his design in 1941. In 1954, this design was first used by Bell Labs to create the first commercially viable silicon solar cell.

Solar panel installers saw significant growth between 2008 and 2013.  Due to that growth many installers had projects that were not "ideal" solar roof tops to work with and had to find solutions to shaded roofs and orientation difficulties.  This challenge was initially addressed by the re-popularization of micro-inverters and later the invention of power optimizers.

Solar panel manufacturers partnered with micro-inverter companies to create AC modules and power optimizer companies partnered with module manufacturers to create smart modules. In 2013 many solar panel manufacturers announced and began shipping their smart module solutions.

Theory and construction 

Photovoltaic modules consist of a large number of solar cells and use light energy (photons) from the Sun to generate electricity through the photovoltaic effect. Most modules use wafer-based crystalline silicon cells or thin-film cells. The structural (load carrying) member of a module can be either the top layer or the back layer. Cells must be protected from mechanical damage and moisture. Most modules are rigid, but semi-flexible ones based on thin-film cells are also available. The cells are usually connected electrically in series, one to another to the desired voltage, and then in parallel to increase current. The power (in watts) of the module is the mathematical product of the voltage (in volts) and the current (in amperes), and depends both on the amount of light and on the electrical load connected to the module. The manufacturing specifications on solar panels are obtained under standard conditions, which are usually not the true operating conditions the solar panels are exposed to on the installation site.

A PV junction box is attached to the back of the solar panel and functions as its output interface. External connections for most photovoltaic modules use MC4 connectors to facilitate easy weatherproof connections to the rest of the system. A USB power interface can also be used. Solar panels also use metal frames consisting of racking components, brackets, reflector shapes, and troughs to better support the panel structure.

Cell connection techniques 
In solar modules, the cells themselves need to be connected together to form the module, with front electrodes blocking the solar cell front optical surface area slightly. To maximize frontal surface area available for sunlight and improve solar cell efficiency, manufacturers use varying rear electrode solar cell connection techniques:

 Passivated emitter rear contact (PERC) adds a polymer film to capture light
 Tunnel oxide passivated contact (TOPCon) adds an oxidation layer to the PERC film to capture more light 
 Interdigitated back contact (IBC)

Arrays of PV modules 
A single solar module can produce only a limited amount of power; most installations contain multiple modules adding their voltages or currents. A photovoltaic system typically includes an array of photovoltaic modules, an inverter, a battery pack for energy storage, a charge controller, interconnection wiring, circuit breakers, fuses, disconnect switches, voltage meters, and optionally a solar tracking mechanism. Equipment is carefully selected to optimize output, and energy storage, reduce power loss during power transmission, and convert from direct current to alternating current.

Smart solar modules 

Smart modules are different from traditional solar panels because the power electronics embedded in the module offers enhanced functionality such as panel-level maximum power point tracking, monitoring, and enhanced safety. Power electronics attached to the frame of a solar module, or connected to the photovoltaic circuit through a connector, are not properly considered smart modules.

Several companies have begun incorporating into each PV module various embedded power electronics such as:

 Maximum power point tracking (|MPPT) power optimizers, a DC-to-DC converter technology developed to maximize the power harvest from solar photovoltaic systems by compensating for shading effects, wherein a shadow falling on a section of a module causes the electrical output of one or more strings of cells in the module to fall to near zero, but not having the output of the entire module fall to zero.
 Solar performance monitors for data and fault detection

Technology 

Most solar modules are currently produced from crystalline silicon (c-Si) solar cells made of polycrystalline or monocrystalline silicon. In 2013, crystalline silicon accounted for more than 90% of worldwide PV production, while the rest of the overall market is made up of thin-film technologies using cadmium telluride (CdTe), copper indium gallium selenide (CIGS) and amorphous silicon .

Emerging, third-generation solar technologies use advanced thin-film cells. They produce a relatively high-efficiency conversion for a lower cost compared with other solar technologies. Also, high-cost, high-efficiency, and close-packed rectangular multi-junction (MJ) cells are usually used in solar panels on spacecraft, as they offer the highest ratio of generated power per kilogram lifted into space. MJ-cells are compound semiconductors and made of gallium arsenide (GaAs) and other semiconductor materials. Another emerging PV technology using MJ-cells is concentrator photovoltaics (CPV).

Thin film 
In rigid thin-film modules, the cell and the module are manufactured on the same production line. The cell is created on a glass substrate or superstrate, and the electrical connections are created in situ, a so-called "monolithic integration." The substrate or superstrate is laminated with an encapsulant to a front or back sheet, usually another sheet of glass. The main cell technologies in this category are CdTe, a-Si+uc-Si tandem, and CIGS. Amorphous silicon has a sunlight conversion rate of 6–12%.

Flexible thin film cells and modules are created on the same production line by depositing the photoactive layer and other necessary layers on a flexible substrate. If the substrate is an insulator (e.g. polyester or polyimide film) then monolithic integration can be used. If it is a conductor then another technique for electrical connection must be used. The cells are assembled into modules by laminating them to a transparent colourless fluoropolymer on the front side, typically ethylene tetrafluoroethylene (ETFE) or fluorinated ethylene propylene (FEP), and a polymer suitable for bonding to the final substrate on the other side.

Mounting and tracking

Ground
Large utility-scale solar power plants usually use ground-mounted photovoltaic systems. Their solar modules are held in place by racks or frames that are attached to ground-based mounting supports. Ground based mounting supports include:
 Pole mounts, which are driven directly into the ground or embedded in concrete.
 Foundation mounts, such as concrete slabs or poured footings
 Ballasted footing mounts, such as concrete or steel bases that use weight to secure the solar module system in position and do not require ground penetration. This type of mounting system is well suited for sites where excavation is not possible such as capped landfills and simplifies decommissioning or relocation of solar module systems.

Roof

Roof-mounted solar power systems consist of solar modules held in place by racks or frames attached to roof-based mounting supports. Roof-based mounting supports include:
 Rail mounts, which are attached directly to the roof structure and may use additional rails for attaching the module racking or frames.
 Ballasted footing mounts, such as concrete or steel bases that use weight to secure the panel system in position and do not require through penetration. This mounting method allows for decommissioning or relocation of solar panel systems with no adverse effect on the roof structure.
All wiring connecting adjacent solar modules to the energy harvesting equipment must be installed according to local electrical codes and should be run in a conduit appropriate for the climate conditions

Tracking
Solar trackers increase the energy produced per module at the cost of mechanical complexity and increased need for maintenance. They sense the direction of the Sun and tilt or rotate the modules as needed for maximum exposure to the light.

Alternatively, fixed racks can hold modules stationary throughout the day at a given tilt (zenith angle) and facing a given direction (azimuth angle). Tilt angles equivalent to an installation's latitude are common. Some systems may also adjust the tilt angle based on the time of year.

On the other hand, east- and west-facing arrays (covering an east–west facing roof, for example) are commonly deployed. Even though such installations will not produce the maximum possible average power from the individual solar panels, the cost of the panels is now usually cheaper than the tracking mechanism and they can provided more economically valuable power during morning and evening peak demands than north or south facing systems.

Concentrator 
Some special solar PV modules include concentrators in which light is focused by lenses or mirrors onto smaller cells. This enables the use of cells with a high cost per unit area (such as gallium arsenide) in a cost-effective way. Concentrating the sunlight can also raise the efficiency to around 45%.

Light capture

The amount of light absorbed by a solar cell depends on the angle of incidence of whatever direct sunlight hits it. This is partly because the amount falling on the panel is proportional to the cosine of the angle of incidence, and partly because at high angle of incidence more light is reflected. To maximize total energy output, modules are often oriented to face south (in the Northern Hemisphere) or north (in the Southern Hemisphere) and tilted to allow for the latitude. Solar tracking can be used to keep the angle of incidence small (see next section).

Solar panels are often coated with an anti-reflective coating, which is one or more thin layers of substances with refractive indices intermediate between that of silicon and that of air. This causes destructive interference in the reflected light, diminishing the amount. Photovoltaic manufacturers have been working to decrease reflectance with improved anti-reflective coatings or with textured glass.

Power curve

In general with solar panels, if not enough current is taken from PVs, then power isn't maximised. If too much current is taken then the voltage collapses. The optimum current draw depends on the amount of sunlight striking the panel. Solar panel capacity is specified by the MPP (maximum power point) value of solar panels in full sunlight.

Module interconnection 

Module electrical connections are made with conducting wires that take the current off the modules and are sized according to the current rating and fault conditions.

Panels are typically connected in series of one or more panels to form strings to achieve a desired output voltage, and strings can be connected in parallel to provide the desired current capability (amperes) of the PV system.

Blocking and bypass diodes may be incorporated within the module or used externally to deal with partial array shading, in order to maximize output. For series connections, bypass diodes are placed in parallel with modules to allow current to bypass shaded modules which would otherwise severely limit the current. For paralleled connections, a blocking diode may be placed in series with each module's string to prevent current flowing backwards through shaded strings thus short-circuiting other strings.

Inverters
Solar inverters convert the DC power provided by panels to AC power.

MPP (Maximum power point) of the solar panel consists of MPP voltage (V) and MPP current (I). Performing maximum power point tracking (MPPT), a solar inverter samples the output (I-V curve) from the solar cell and applies the proper electrical load to obtain maximum power.

Solar panels are wired to inverters in parallel or series (a 'string'). In string connections the voltages of the modules add, but the current is determined by the lowest performing panel. This is known as the "Christmas light effect". In parallel connections the voltages will be the same, but the currents add. Arrays are connected up to meet the voltage requirements of the inverters and to not greatly exceed the current limits.

Micro-inverters work independently to enable each panel to contribute its maximum possible output for a given amount of sunlight, but can be more expensive.

Connectors
Outdoor solar panels usually include MC4 connectors. Automotive solar panels may also include an auxiliary power outlet and/or USB adapter. Indoor panels (including solar pv glasses, thin films and windows) can integrate a microinverter (AC Solar panels).

Efficiency 

Each module is rated by its DC output power under standard test conditions (STC) and hence the on field output power might vary. Power typically ranges from 100 to 365 Watts (W). The efficiency of a module determines the area of a module given the same rated output an 8% efficient 230 W module will have twice the area of a 16% efficient 230 W module. Some commercially available solar modules exceed 24% efficiency. Currently, the best achieved sunlight conversion rate (solar module efficiency) is around 21.5% in new commercial products typically lower than the efficiencies of their cells in isolation. The most efficient mass-produced solar modules have power density values of up to 175 W/m2 (16.22 W/ft2).

The current versus voltage curve of a module provides useful information about its electrical performance. Manufacturing processes often cause differences in the electrical parameters of different modules photovoltaic, even in cells of the same type. Therefore, only the experimental measurement of the I–V curve allows us to accurately establish the electrical parameters of a photovoltaic device. This measurement provides highly relevant information for the design, installation and maintenance of photovoltaic systems. Generally, the electrical parameters of photovoltaic modules are measured by indoor tests. However, outdoor testing has important advantages such as no expensive artificial light source required, no sample size limitation, and more homogeneous sample illumination.

Scientists from Spectrolab, a subsidiary of Boeing, have reported development of multi-junction solar cells with an efficiency of more than 40%, a new world record for solar photovoltaic cells. The Spectrolab scientists also predict that concentrator solar cells could achieve efficiencies of more than 45% or even 50% in the future, with theoretical efficiencies being about 58% in cells with more than three junctions.

Capacity factor of solar panels is limited primarily by geographic latitude and varies significantly depending on cloud cover, dust, day length and other factors. In the United Kingdom, seasonal capacity factor ranges from 2% (December) to 20% (July), with average annual capacity factor of 10–11%, while in Spain the value reaches 18%. 
Globally, capacity factor for utility-scale PV farms was 16.1% in 2019.

Overheating is the most important factor for the efficiency of the solar panel.

Radiation-dependent efficiency 
Depending on construction, photovoltaic modules can produce electricity from a range of frequencies of light, but usually cannot cover the entire solar radiation range (specifically, ultraviolet, infrared and low or diffused light). Hence, much of the incident sunlight energy is wasted by solar modules, and they can give far higher efficiencies if illuminated with monochromatic light. Therefore, another design concept is to split the light into six to eight different wavelength ranges that will produce a different color of light, and direct the beams onto different cells tuned to those ranges. This has been projected to be capable of raising efficiency by 50%.

Aluminum nanocylinders

Research by Imperial College London has shown that solar panel efficiency is improved by studding the light-receiving semiconductor surface with aluminum nanocylinders, similar to the ridges on Lego blocks. The scattered light then travels along a longer path in the semiconductor, absorbing more photons to be converted into current. Although these nanocylinders have been used previously (aluminum was preceded by gold and silver), the light scattering occurred in the near-infrared region and visible light was absorbed strongly. Aluminum was found to have absorbed the ultraviolet part of the spectrum, while the visible and near-infrared parts of the spectrum were found to be scattered by the aluminum surface. This, the research argued, could bring down the cost significantly and improve the efficiency as aluminum is more abundant and less costly than gold and silver. The research also noted that the increase in current makes thinner film solar panels technically feasible without "compromising power conversion efficiencies, thus reducing material consumption".

Performance and degradation 

Module performance is generally rated under standard test conditions (STC): irradiance of 1,000 W/m2, solar spectrum of AM 1.5 and module temperature at 25 °C. The actual voltage and current output of the module changes as lighting, temperature and load conditions change, so there is never one specific voltage at which the module operates. Performance varies depending on geographic location, time of day, the day of the year, amount of solar irradiance, direction and tilt of modules, cloud cover, shading, soiling, state of charge, and temperature. Performance of a module or panel can be measured at different time intervals with a DC clamp meter or shunt and logged, graphed, or charted with a chart recorder or data logger.

For optimum performance, a solar panel needs to be made of similar modules oriented in the same direction perpendicular to direct sunlight. Bypass diodes are used to circumvent broken or shaded panels and optimize output. These bypass diodes are usually placed along groups of solar cells to create a continuous flow.

Electrical characteristics include nominal power (PMAX, measured in W), open-circuit voltage (VOC), short-circuit current (ISC, measured in amperes), maximum power voltage (VMPP), maximum power current (IMPP), peak power, (watt-peak, Wp), and module efficiency (%).

Open-circuit voltage or VOC is the maximum voltage the module can produce when not connected to an electrical circuit or system. VOC can be measured with a voltmeter directly on an illuminated module's terminals or on its disconnected cable.

The peak power rating, Wp, is the maximum output under standard test conditions (not the maximum possible output). At the time of testing, the test modules are binned according to their test results, and a typical manufacturer might rate their modules in 5 W increments, and either rate them at +/- 3%, +/-5%, +3/-0% or +5/-0%.

Influence of temperature 

The performance of a photovoltaic (PV) module depends on the environmental conditions, mainly on the global incident irradiance G in the plane of the module. However, the temperature T of the p–n junction also influences the main electrical parameters: the short circuit current ISC, the open circuit voltage VOC and the maximum power Pmax. In general, it is known that VOC shows a significant inverse correlation with T, while for ISC this correlation is direct, but weaker, so that this increase does not compensate for the decrease in VOC. As a consequence, Pmax decreases when T increases. This correlation between the power output of a solar cell and the working temperature of its junction depends on the semiconductor material, and is due to the influence of T on the concentration, lifetime, and mobility of the intrinsic carriers, i.e., electrons and gaps. inside the photovoltaic cell.

Temperature sensitivity is usually described by temperature coefficients, each of which expresses the derivative of the parameter to which it refers with respect to the junction temperature. The values ​​of these parameters can be found in any data sheet of the photovoltaic module; are the following:

- β: VOC variation coefficient with respect to T, given by ∂VOC/∂T.

- α: Coefficient of variation of ISC with respect to T, given by ∂ISC/∂T.

- δ: Coefficient of variation of Pmax with respect to T, given by ∂Pmax/∂T.

Techniques for estimating these coefficients from experimental data can be found in the literature

Degradation

The ability of solar modules to withstand damage by rain, hail, heavy snow load, and cycles of heat and cold varies by manufacturer, although most solar panels on the U.S. market are UL listed, meaning they have gone through testing to withstand hail.

Potential-induced degradation (also called PID) is a potential-induced performance degradation in crystalline photovoltaic modules, caused by so-called stray currents. This effect may cause power loss of up to 30%.

Advancements in photovoltaic technologies have brought about the process of "doping" the silicon substrate to lower the activation energy thereby making the panel more efficient in converting photons to retrievable electrons.

Chemicals such as boron (p-type) are applied into the semiconductor crystal in order to create donor and acceptor energy levels substantially closer to the valence and conductor bands. In doing so, the addition of boron impurity allows the activation energy to decrease twenty-fold from 1.12 eV to 0.05 eV. Since the potential difference (EB) is so low, the boron is able to thermally ionize at room temperatures. This allows for free energy carriers in the conduction and valence bands thereby allowing greater conversion of photons to electrons.

The power output of a photovoltaic (PV) device decreases over time. This decrease is due to its exposure to solar radiation as well as other external conditions. The degradation index, which is defined as the annual percentage of output power loss, is a key factor in determining the long-term production of a photovoltaic plant. To estimate this degradation, the percentage of decrease associated with each of the electrical parameters. The individual degradation of a photovoltaic module can significantly influence the performance of a complete string. Furthermore, not all modules in the same installation decrease their performance at exactly the same rate. Given a set of modules exposed to long-term outdoor conditions, the individual degradation of the main electrical parameters and the increase in their dispersion must be considered. As each module tends to degrade differently, the behavior of the modules will be increasingly different over time, negatively affecting the overall performance of the plant.

There are several studies dealing with the power degradation analysis of modules based on different photovoltaic technologies available in the literature. According to a recent study, the degradation of crystalline silicon modules is very regular, oscillating between 0.8% and 1.0% per year.

On the other hand, if we analyze the performance of thin-film photovoltaic modules, an initial period of strong degradation is observed (which can last several months and even up to 2 years), followed by a later stage in which the degradation stabilizes, being then comparable to that of crystalline silicon. Strong seasonal variations are also observed in such thin-film technologies because the influence of the solar spectrum is much greater. For example, for modules of amorphous silicon, micromorphic silicon or cadmium telluride, we are talking about annual degradation rates for the first years of between 3% and 4%. However, other technologies, such as CIGS, show much lower degradation rates, even in those early years.

Maintenance 
Solar panel conversion efficiency, typically in the 20% range, is reduced by the accumulation of dust, grime, pollen, and other particulates on the solar panels, collectively referred to as soiling. "A dirty solar panel can reduce its power capabilities by up to 30% in high dust/pollen or desert areas", says Seamus Curran, associate professor of physics at the University of Houston and director of the Institute for NanoEnergy, which specializes in the design, engineering, and assembly of nanostructures.
The average soiling loss in the world in 2018 is estimated to be at least 3% – 4%.

Paying to have solar panels cleaned is a good investment in many regions, as of 2019.
However, in some regions, cleaning is not cost-effective. In California as of 2013 soiling-induced financial losses were rarely enough to warrant the cost of washing the panels. On average, panels in California lost a little less than 0.05% of their overall efficiency per day.

There are also occupational hazards with solar panel installation and maintenance. A 2015–2018 study in the UK investigated 80 PV-related incidents of fire, with over 20 "serious fires" directly caused by PV installation, including 37 domestic buildings and 6 solar farms. In  of the incidents a root cause was not established and in a majority of others was caused by poor installation, faulty product or design issues. The most frequent single element causing fires was the DC isolators.

A 2021 study by kWh Analytics determined median annual degradation of PV systems at 1.09% for residential and 0.8% for non-residential ones, almost twice that previously assumed. A 2021 module reliability study found an increasing trend in solar module failure rates with 30% of manufacturers experiencing safety failures related to junction boxes (growth from 20%) and 26% bill-of-materials failures (growth from 20%).

Cleaning methods for solar panels can be divided into 5 groups: manual tools, mechanized tools (such as tractor mounted brushes), installed hydraulic systems (such as sprinklers), installed robotic systems, and deployable robots. Manual cleaning tools are by far the most prevalent method of cleaning, most likely because of the low purchase cost. However, in a Saudi Arabian study done in 2014, it was found that "installed robotic systems, mechanized systems, and installed hydraulic systems are likely the three most promising technologies for use in cleaning solar panels".

Waste and recycling 
There were 30 thousand tonnes of PV waste in 2021, and the annual amount was estimated by Bloomberg NEF to rise to more than 1 million tons by 2035 and more than 10 million by 2050. Most parts of a solar module can be recycled including up to 95% of certain semiconductor materials or the glass as well as large amounts of ferrous and non-ferrous metals. Some private companies and non-profit organizations are currently engaged in take-back and recycling operations for end-of-life modules. EU law requires manufacturers to ensure their solar panels are recycled properly. Similar legislation is underway in Japan, India, and Australia.

A 2021 study by Harvard Business Review indicates that, unless reused, by 2035 the discarded panels would outweigh new units by a factor of 2.56. They forecast the cost of recycling a single PV panel by then would reach $20–30, which would increase the LCOE of PV by a factor 4. Analyzing the US market, where no EU-like legislation exists as of 2021, HBR noted that without mandatory recycling legislation and with the cost of sending it to a landfill being just $1–2 there was a significant financial incentive to discard the decommissioned panels. The study assumed that consumers would replace panels half way through a 30 year lifetime to make a profit. However prices of new panels increased in the year after the study. A 2022 study found that modules were lasting longer than previously estimated, and said that might result in less PV waste than had been thought.

Recycling possibilities depend on the kind of technology used in the modules:
 Silicon based modules: aluminum frames and junction boxes are dismantled manually at the beginning of the process. The module is then crushed in a mill and the different fractions are separated – glass, plastics and metals. It is possible to recover more than 80% of the incoming weight. This process can be performed by flat glass recyclers since morphology and composition of a PV module is similar to those flat glasses used in the building and automotive industry. The recovered glass, for example, is readily accepted by the glass foam and glass insulation industry. 
 Non-silicon based modules: they require specific recycling technologies such as the use of chemical baths in order to separate the different semiconductor materials. For cadmium telluride modules, the recycling process begins by crushing the module and subsequently separating the different fractions. This recycling process is designed to recover up to 90% of the glass and 95% of the semiconductor materials contained. Some commercial-scale recycling facilities have been created in recent years by private companies. For aluminium flat plate reflector: the trendiness of the reflectors has been brought up by fabricating them using a thin layer (around 0.016 mm to 0.024 mm) of aluminum coating present inside the non-recycled plastic food packages.

Since 2010, there is an annual European conference bringing together manufacturers, recyclers and researchers to look at the future of PV module recycling.

Production 
 

The production of PV systems has followed a classic learning curve effect, with significant cost reduction occurring alongside large rises in efficiency and production output.

With over 100% year-on-year growth in PV system installation, PV module makers dramatically increased their shipments of solar modules in 2019. They actively expanded their capacity and turned themselves into gigawatt GW players. According to Pulse Solar, five of the top ten PV module companies in 2019 have experienced a rise in solar panel production by at least 25% compared to 2019.

The basis of producing solar panels revolves around the use of silicon cells. These silicon cells are typically 10–20% efficient at converting sunlight into electricity, with newer production models now exceeding 22%.

In 2018, the world's top five solar module producers in terms of shipped capacity during the calendar year of 2018 were Jinko Solar, JA Solar, Trina Solar, Longi solar, and Canadian Solar.

Price 

The price of solar electrical power has continued to fall so that in many countries it has become cheaper than fossil fuel electricity from the electricity grid since 2012, a phenomenon known as grid parity.

Average pricing information divides in three pricing categories: those buying small quantities (modules of all sizes in the kilowatt range annually), mid-range buyers (typically up to 10 MWp annually), and large quantity buyers (self-explanatory—and with access to the lowest prices). Over the long term there is clearly a systematic reduction in the price of cells and modules. For example, in 2012 it was estimated that the quantity cost per watt was about US$0.60, which was 250 times lower than the cost in 1970 of US$150. A 2015 study shows price/kWh dropping by 10% per year since 1980, and predicts that solar could contribute 20% of total electricity consumption by 2030, whereas the International Energy Agency predicts 16% by 2050.

Real-world energy production costs depend a great deal on local weather conditions. In a cloudy country such as the United Kingdom, the cost per produced kWh is higher than in sunnier countries like Spain.

Following to RMI, Balance-of-System (BoS) elements, this is, non-module cost of non-microinverter solar modules (as wiring, converters, racking systems and various components) make up about half of the total costs of installations.

For merchant solar power stations, where the electricity is being sold into the electricity transmission network, the cost of solar energy will need to match the wholesale electricity price. This point is sometimes called 'wholesale grid parity' or 'busbar parity'.

Some photovoltaic systems, such as rooftop installations, can supply power directly to an electricity user. In these cases, the installation can be competitive when the output cost matches the price at which the user pays for their electricity consumption. This situation is sometimes called 'retail grid parity', 'socket parity' or 'dynamic grid parity'. Research carried out by UN-Energy in 2012 suggests areas of sunny countries with high electricity prices, such as Italy, Spain and Australia, and areas using diesel generators, have reached retail grid parity.

Standards 
Standards generally used in photovoltaic modules:
 IEC 61215 (crystalline silicon performance), 61646 (thin film performance) and 61730 (all modules, safety), 61853 (Photovoltaic module performance testing & energy rating)
 ISO 9488 Solar energy—Vocabulary.
 UL 1703 from Underwriters Laboratories
 UL 1741 from Underwriters Laboratories
 UL 2703 from Underwriters Laboratories
 CE mark
 Electrical Safety Tester (EST) Series (EST-460, EST-22V, EST-22H, EST-110).

Applications 

There are many practical applications for the use of solar panels or photovoltaics. It can first be used in agriculture as a power source for irrigation. In health care solar panels can be used to refrigerate medical supplies. It can also be used for infrastructure. PV modules are used in photovoltaic systems and include a large variety of electric devices:
 Solar canals
 Photovoltaic power stations
 Rooftop solar PV systems
 Standalone PV systems
 Solar hybrid power systems
 Concentrated photovoltaics
 Floating solar; water-borne solar panels
 Solar planes
 Solar-powered water purification
 Solar-pumped lasers
 Solar vehicles
 Solar panels on spacecraft and space stations

Limitations

Impact on electricity network 
With the increasing levels of rooftop photovoltaic systems, the energy flow becomes 2-way. When there is more local generation than consumption, electricity is exported to the grid. However, an electricity network traditionally is not designed to deal with the 2- way energy transfer. Therefore, some technical issues may occur. For example, in Queensland Australia, more than 30% of households used rooftop PV by the end of 2017. The duck curve appeared often for a lot of communities from 2015 onwards. An over-voltage issue may result as the electricity flows from PV households back to the network. There are solutions to manage the over voltage issue, such as regulating PV inverter power factor, new voltage and energy control equipment at the electricity distributor level, re-conducting the electricity wires, demand side management, etc. There are often limitations and costs related to these solutions.

When electric networks are down, such as during the October 2019 California power shutoff, solar panels are often insufficient to fully provide power to a house or other structure, because they are designed to supply power to the grid, not directly to homes.

Implication onto electricity bill management and energy investment 
There is no silver bullet in electricity or energy demand and bill management, because customers (sites) have different specific situations, e.g. different comfort/convenience needs, different electricity tariffs, or different usage patterns. Electricity tariff may have a few elements, such as daily access and metering charge, energy charge (based on kWh, MWh) or peak demand charge (e.g. a price for the highest 30min energy consumption in a month). PV is a promising option for reducing energy charge when electricity price is reasonably high and continuously increasing, such as in Australia and Germany. However, for sites with peak demand charge in place, PV may be less attractive if peak demands mostly occur in the late afternoon to early evening, for example residential communities. Overall, energy investment is largely an economical decision and it is better to make investment decisions based on systematical evaluation of options in operational improvement, energy efficiency, onsite generation and energy storage.

Solar module quality assurance 

Solar module quality assurance involves testing and evaluating solar cells and Solar Panels to ensure the quality requirements of them are met. Solar modules (or panels) are expected to have a long service life between 20 and 40 years. They should continually and reliably convey and deliver the power anticipated. modules presented to a wide exhibit of climate conditions alongside use in various temperatures. Solar modules can be tested through a combination of physical tests, laboratory studies, and numerical analyses. Furthermore, solar modules need to be assessed throughout the different stages of their life cycle. Various companies such as Southern Research Energy & Environment, SGS Consumer Testing Services, TÜV Rheinland, Sinovoltaics, Clean Energy Associates (CEA), CSA Solar International and Enertis provide services in solar module quality assurance."The implementation of consistent traceable and stable manufacturing processes becomes mandatory to safeguard and ensure the quality of the PV Modules"

Stages of testing 

The lifecycle stages of testing solar modules can include: the Conceptual phase, manufacturing phase, transportation and installation, commissioning phase, and the in-service phase. Depending on the test phase, different test principles may apply.

Conceptual phase 
The first stage can involve design verification where the expected output of the module is tested through computer simulation. Further, the modules ability to withstand natural environment conditions such as temperature, rain, hail,
snow, corrosion, dust, lightning, horizon and near-shadow effects is tested. The layout for design and construction of the module and the quality of components and installation  can also be tested at this stage.

Manufacturing phase 
Inspecting manufacturers of components is carried through visitation. The inspection can include assembly checks, material testing supervision and Non Destructive Testing (NDT). Certification is carried our according to ANSI/UL1703, IEC 17025, IEC 61215, IEC 61646, IEC 61701 and IEC 61730-1/-2.

AC module

An AC module is a photovoltaic module which has a small AC inverter mounted onto its back side which produces AC power with no external DC connector.

AC modules are defined by Underwriters Laboratories as the smallest and most complete system for harvesting solar energy.

See also 

 Daisy chain (electrical engineering)
 Digital modeling and fabrication
 Domestic energy consumption
 Grid-tied electrical system
 Growth of photovoltaics
 MC4 connector
 Solar charger
 Solar cooker
 Solar still
 Junction box

References 

Photovoltaics
Panel
Smart devices
Solar power